Bruno Richard Hauptmann (November 26, 1899 – April 3, 1936) was  a German-born carpenter who was convicted of the abduction and murder of the 20-month-old son of aviator Charles Lindbergh and his wife Anne Morrow Lindbergh. The Lindbergh kidnapping became known as "The Crime of the Century". Both Hauptmann and his wife, Anna Hauptmann (who later sued the State of New Jersey, various former police officers, the Hearst newspapers that had published pre-trial articles insisting on Hauptmann's guilt, and former prosecutor David T. Wilentz), proclaimed his innocence until he was executed in 1936 by electric chair at the Trenton State Prison.

Background
Bruno Richard Hauptmann was born in Kamenz, a town near Dresden in the Kingdom of Saxony, which was a state of the German Empire. He was the youngest of five children. Neither he nor his family or friends used the name Bruno, although prosecutors in the Lindbergh kidnapping trial insisted on referring to him by that name. At the age of eleven, he joined the Boy Scouts (Pfadfinderbund).  Hauptmann attended public school during the day while attending trade school (Gewerbeschule) at night, studying carpentry for the first year, then switching to machine building (Maschinenschlosser) for the next two years.
 
Hauptmann's father died in 1917. During that same year, Hauptmann learned that his brother, Herman, had been killed fighting in France in World War I. Not long after that, he was informed that another brother, Max, had also been killed while fighting in Russia. Shortly thereafter, Hauptmann was conscripted and assigned to the artillery.

Upon receiving his orders, he was sent to Bautzen but was transferred to the 103rd Infantry Replacement Regiment upon his arrival. In 1918, Hauptmann was assigned to the 12th Machine Gun Company at Königsbrück. Hauptmann later claimed he was deployed to western France with the 177th Regiment of Machine Gunners in either August or September 1918, then fought in the Battle of Saint-Mihiel; that he was gassed in September or October 1918; and that he was struck in the helmet by shrapnel from shelling, knocking him out so that he was left for dead. When he came to, he crawled back to safety and was back on duty that evening.

After the war, Hauptmann and a friend robbed two women wheeling baby carriages they were using to transport food on the road between Wiesa and Nebelschütz. The friend wielded Hauptmann's army pistol during the commission of this crime. Hauptmann's other charges include burglarizing a mayor's house with the use of a ladder. Released after three years in prison, he was arrested three months later on suspicion of additional burglaries.

Hauptmann illegally entered the United States by stowing away on an ocean liner. Landing in New York City in November 1923, the 24-year-old Hauptmann was taken in by a member of the established German community and worked as a carpenter. He married a German waitress, Anna Schoeffler (1898–1994), in 1925 and became a father eight years later.

Lindbergh kidnapping

Crime and investigation
On the evening of March 1, 1932, Charles Lindbergh Jr., son of aviator Charles Lindbergh, was kidnapped from Highfields, New Jersey; a homemade ladder was found under the window of the child's room. The $50,000 demanded in a ransom note had been delivered by Dr. John F. Condon, but the infant's body was found on May 12 in woods  from the family's home. The death was ascribed to a blow to the head, which some have theorized occurred accidentally during the abduction.

On September 15, 1934, a bank teller realized that the serial number on a $10 gold certificate deposited by a gas station was on the list of Lindbergh ransom bills. On the bill's margin, the attendant had written the license plate number of the customer's car, which turned out to be Hauptmann's. Hauptmann was placed under surveillance by the New York City Police Department, New Jersey State Police, and the FBI.

On September 19, Hauptmann realized he was being watched and attempted to escape, speeding and running through red lights. He was captured after finding himself blocked by a truck on Park Avenue just north of Tremont Avenue in the Bronx.

Trial
His trial was dubbed the "Trial of the Century", while Hauptmann was named "The Most Hated Man in the World".

Evidence against Hauptmann included: $14,600 of the ransom money found in his garage; testimony alleging handwriting and spelling similarities to that found on the ransom notes; testimony that lumber used in constructing the ladder probably originated in Hauptmann's house; Condon's address and telephone number found written on the inside of one of Hauptmann's closets; and what appeared to be a hand-drawn sketch of a ladder found in one of Hauptmann's notebooks. Experts retained by the defense were never called to testify.

During the trial, Hauptmann was identified as the man who received the ransom money, the man who had spent some of the ransom gold certificates, and as a man seen near the Lindbergh home on the day of the kidnapping. He had been absent from work on the day of the ransom payment and had quit his job two days later.

Hauptmann's attorney, Edward J. Reilly, argued that the evidence against Hauptmann was entirely circumstantial, as no reliable witness had placed Hauptmann at the scene of the crime, nor were his fingerprints found on the ladder, the ransom notes, or anywhere in the nursery.

Hauptmann was convicted, however, and immediately sentenced to death. His appeals failed, though his execution stayed twice while New Jersey Governor Harold G. Hoffman reviewed the case.

Execution
On April 3, 1936, Hauptmann was executed in the electric chair at the New Jersey State Prison. Reporters present said he made no statement. His spiritual advisor said that Hauptmann told him, before being taken from his cell, "Ich bin absolut unschuldig an den Verbrechen, die man mir zur Last legt" ("I am absolutely innocent of the crimes with which I am charged").

Hauptmann's widow Anna had his body cremated. Two Lutheran pastors conducted a private memorial service in German. A crowd of some 2,000 gathered outside.

Guilt questioned
In the latter part of the 20th century, the case against Hauptmann came under serious scrutiny. For instance, one item of evidence at his trial was a scrawled phone number on a board in his closet, which was the number of the man who delivered the ransom, John F. Condon. A juror at the trial said this was the one item that convinced him the most; according to some accounts, a reporter later admitted he had written the number himself.

Additionally, neither Lindbergh nor the go-between who delivered the ransom initially identified Hauptmann as the recipient.  Condon, after seeing Hauptmann in a lineup at New York Police Department Greenwich Street Station told FBI Special Agent Turrou that Hauptmann was not "John," the man whom Condon claimed he had passed the ransom money to in St. Raymond's Cemetery. He further stated that Hauptmann looked different (for instance that he had different eyes, was heavier, and had different hair), and that "John" was actually dead because he had been murdered by his confederates.

While waiting in a car nearby, Lindbergh heard the voice of "John" calling to Condon during the ransom drop-off, but never saw him. Although he testified before the Bronx grand jury that he heard only the words "Hey, Doc!", and that it would be very difficult to say he could recognize a man by his voice, he identified Hauptmann as having the same voice during his trial in Flemington. The police beat Hauptmann while in custody at the Greenwich Street Station.

Other coverage has said that certain witnesses were intimidated, and some claim that the police planted or doctored evidence, such as the ladder; or that the police doctored Hauptmann's time cards and ignored fellow workers who stated that Hauptmann was working the day of the kidnapping. These and other findings prompted J. Edgar Hoover, the first Director of the FBI, to question the manner in which the investigation and the trial were conducted. Hauptmann's widow campaigned until the end of her life to have her husband's conviction reversed.

Erastus Mead Hudson was a fingerprint expert who knew about the then-rare silver nitrate process of collecting fingerprints from wood and other surfaces on which the previous powder method would not work. He found that Hauptmann's fingerprints were not on the wood, even in places that the man who made the ladder must have touched. Upon reporting this to a police officer and stating that they must look further, the officer said, "Good God, don't tell us that, Doctor!" The ladder was then washed of all fingerprints, and Colonel Norman Schwarzkopf, Sr, the Superintendent of the New Jersey State Police, refused to disclose to the public that Hauptmann's prints were not on the ladder.

Several books have been written proclaiming Hauptmann's innocence. These books variously criticize the police for allowing the crime scenes to become contaminated, Lindbergh and his associates for interfering with the investigation, Hauptmann's trial lawyers for ineffectively representing him, and the reliability of the witnesses and physical evidence presented at the trial. Scottish journalist Ludovic Kennedy in particular questioned much of the evidence, such as the origin of the ladder and the testimony of many of the witnesses.

In her book about another high-profile trial of the 1930s, the Winnie Ruth Judd case, investigative reporter Jana Bommersbach argued that Hauptmann could not have received a fair trial because the press created an atmosphere of prejudice against him. Bommersbach noted that in those days, newspapers acted as both "judge and jury," and covered crime in a way that would be considered sensationalistic today.

For more than 50 years, Hauptmann's widow fought with the New Jersey courts without success to have the case re-opened. In 1982, the now 82-year-old Anna Hauptmann sued the State of New Jersey, various former police officers, the Hearst newspapers that had published pre-trial articles insisting on Hauptmann's guilt, and former prosecutor David T. Wilentz (then 86) for over $100 million in wrongful-death damages. She claimed that the newly discovered documents proved misconduct by the prosecution and the manufacture of evidence by government agents, all of whom were biased against Hauptmann because he happened to be of German ethnicity. In 1983, the United States Supreme Court refused her request that the federal judge considering the case should be disqualified because of judicial bias, and in 1984 the judge dismissed her claims.

In 1985, more than 23,000 pages of Hauptmann-case police documents were found in the garage of the late Governor Hoffman. These documents, along with 34,000 pages of FBI files, which, although discovered in 1981, had not been disclosed to the public, represented a windfall of previously undisclosed information. As a direct result of this new evidence, Anna Hauptmann again amended her civil complaint on July 14, 1986, to clear her late husband's name by continuing to assert that he was "framed from beginning to end" by the police looking for a suspect. She suggested that the rail of the ladder taken from the attic, where they used to live in 1935, was planted by the police, and that the ransom money was left behind by Isidor Fisch, who was possibly the real kidnapper. Fisch applied for a passport on 12 May 1932, the same day that the Lindbergh baby was found dead. On 9 December 1933, he sailed for Germany, taking with him $600 worth of Reichsmarks. In 1990, New Jersey's governor, James Florio, declined her appeal for a meeting to clear Bruno Hauptmann's name. Anna Hauptmann died on October 10, 1994.

In 1974, Anthony Scaduto wrote Scapegoat, which took the position that Hauptmann was framed and that the police both withheld and fabricated evidence. This led to further investigation, and in 1985, Ludovic Kennedy published The Airman and the Carpenter, in which he argued that Hauptmann had not kidnapped and murdered Charles Augustus Lindbergh Jr. The book was made into a 1996 television film Crime of the Century, starring Stephen Rea and Isabella Rossellini.

Not all modern authors agree with these theories. Jim Fisher, a former FBI agent and professor at Edinboro University of Pennsylvania, has written two books on the subject, The Lindbergh Case (1987) and The Ghosts of Hopewell (1999) to address, at least in part, what he calls a "revision movement". In these texts, he explains in detail the evidence against Hauptmann. He provides an interpretation discussing both the pros and cons of that evidence. He concluded: "Today, the Lindbergh phenomena [sic] is a giant hoax perpetrated by people who are taking advantage of an uninformed and cynical public. Notwithstanding all of the books, TV programs, and legal suits, Hauptmann is as guilty today as he was in 1932 when he kidnapped and killed the son of Mr and Mrs Charles Lindbergh."

Lindbergh believed that Hauptmann must have been involved in the kidnapping and murder of his son. He remarked that Hauptmann was magnificently built but had eyes like a wild boar.

See also

 J. Edgar (film)
 Presumption of guilt

References

Further reading
 "Sleeping Dogs: A true story of the Lindbergh baby kidnapping," Split Oak Press, Ithaca, New York, Copyright 2012 by Michael Foldes, 236 pages.
 "The Sixteenth Rail," Fulcrum Publishing, Golden, Colorado, copyright by Adam Schrager, 2013, 314 pages.
 "Hauptmann's Ladder: A Step-by-Step Analysis of the Lindbergh Kidnapping," Kent State University Press, Kent, Ohio, Copyright 2014 by Richard T. Cahill Jr., 448 pages.
 "The Dark Corners – Of the Lindbergh Kidnapping Volume 1," Infinity Publishing, Copyright 2016 by Michael Melsky, 353 pages.

External links
 Photographic Evidence from the Hauptmann Case on the New Jersey State Archives Website
 Author Jim Fisher's Site on the Hauptmann Case
 YouTube: Hauptmann Testifies, Millions Wait 1935/01/30

1899 births
1936 deaths
20th-century executions by New Jersey
20th-century German criminals
Criminals from Saxony
Executed people from Saxony
German emigrants to the United States
German male criminals
German Lutherans
German Army personnel of World War I
German murderers of children
German people convicted of murder
German people executed abroad
Lindbergh kidnapping
People convicted of murder by New Jersey
People executed by New Jersey by electric chair
People executed for murder
People from Kamenz
People from the Kingdom of Saxony
Illegal immigration to the United States